Andrew O'Flynn (born 1946) is an Irish retired hurler who played as a full-forward for the Cork senior team.

O'Flynn joined the team during the 1967 championship and was a regular member of the starting fifteen until he left the panel after the 1968 championship. During that time he enjoyed little success.

At club level O'Flynn was a one-time Munster medalist with Glen Rovers. In addition to this he also won three county club championship medals.

Playing career

Club

O'Flynn played his club hurling with Glen Rovers and enjoyed much success during a brief career.

In 1964 he was just out of the minor grade when he lined out for the Glen in the championship decider. A 3-12 to 2-7 defeat of south side rivals St. Finbarr's gave O'Flynn his first championship medal. Glen Rovers later qualified for the inaugural provincial club decider. A 3-7 to 1-7 defeat of Mount Sion gave O'Flynn a Munster medal.

Three years later in 1967 Glen Rovers and St. Finbarr's faced off in the county decider once again. A 3-9 to 1-9 victory gave O'Flynn a second championship medal.

Once again the Glen failed to secure back-to-back titles, however, O'Flynn lined out in a third decider in 1969. A 4-16 to 1-13 defeat of UCC gave him a third championship medal.

Inter-county

O'Flynn first came to prominence on the inter-county scene as a member of the Cork minor hurling team and in 1964 enjoyed the ultimate success in that grade. A 2-14 to 2-9 defeat of Tipperary gave him a Munster. Cork later overwhelmed Laois in a unique All-Ireland decider. A remarkable 10-7 to 1-4 score line gave Cork the title and gave O'Flynn an All-Ireland medal in what was his last game in that grade.

By 1966 O'Flynn was a key member of the Cork under-21 team. He won a Munster medal that year as Cork trounced Limerick by 5-12 to 2-6 in the provincial decider. The subsequent All-Ireland final ended in a draw as Wexford recorded 5-6 to Cork's 3-12. The replay also ended all square - 4-9 apiece. At the third time of asking Cork emerged victorious with a huge tally of 9-9 to 5-9.  This victory gave Cork their first All-Ireland title in this grade and gave O'Flynn an All-Ireland Under-21 Hurling Championship medal.

O'Flynn made his senior debut in a Munster semi-final defeat by Waterford in 1967. His two years on the team ended without any success as Cork failed to emerge from the provincial series.

Honours

Team
Glen Rovers
Munster Senior Club Hurling Championship (1): 1964
Cork Senior Club Hurling Championship (3): 1964, 1967, 1969

Cork
All-Ireland Under-21 Hurling Championship (1): 1966
Munster Under-21 Hurling Championship (1): 1966 
All-Ireland Minor Hurling Championship (1): 1964
Munster Minor Hurling Championship (1): 1964

References

1946 births
Living people
Glen Rovers hurlers
Cork inter-county hurlers